Philemon Kiwelu Ndesamburo (19 February 1935 – 31 May 2017) was a Tanzanian CHADEMA politician and Member of Parliament for Moshi Town constituency since 2000–2015.

References

1935 births
Living people
Chadema MPs
Tanzanian MPs 2000–2005
Tanzanian MPs 2005–2010
Tanzanian MPs 2010–2015
Old Moshi Secondary School alumni